Kiran Bishnoi, also known as Kiran Godara, is a freestyle wrestler from India. She was bronze medallist at the 2018 Commonwealth Games. She has also been gold medallist at the Commonwealth Wrestling Championships in 2017.

Early life and career
Bishnoi, who is also known as Kiran Godara, was born to Kuldeep Godara and Sunita Godara in Rawat Khera village of Hisar district, Haryana. She spent her childhood at her maternal grandparents' home in Kalirawan village of Hisar district. Her maternal grandfather Ramswaroop Khichad Kalirawna was a wrestler, and he used to take her with him for wrestling practice. This led to development of her interest in the sport. After the death of her grandfather in 2010, she returned to her parental home in Hisar, and started practicing wrestling at Mahabir Stadium under the guidance of her coach Vishnu. She missed the trials of 2014 Commonwealth Games due to a career-threatening knee injury. After eventually recovering from the injury, she became national champion in 2015. She also won Bharat Kesri Dangal title in 2016, and was finalist of the event in 2015.

Bishnoi won gold medal at the 2017 Commonwealth Wrestling Championships in Johannesburg. At the 2018 Commonwealth Games, after losing the semifinal by technical fall to Nigeria's Blessing Onyebuchi in the 76 kg category, Bishnoi won the bronze medal bout by technical fall win over Mauritius' Katouskia Pariadhaven.

In 2021, she lost her bronze medal match in the women's 76 kg event at the World Wrestling Championships held in Oslo, Norway.

References

External links
Profile at United World Wrestling

Living people
Indian female sport wrestlers
Female sport wrestlers from Haryana
People from Hisar district
Commonwealth Games medallists in wrestling
Commonwealth Games bronze medallists for India
Wrestlers at the 2018 Asian Games
Year of birth missing (living people)
Wrestlers at the 2018 Commonwealth Games
Asian Games competitors for India
21st-century Indian women
Medallists at the 2018 Commonwealth Games